Gheorghe Rașovan (born 6 March 1955) is a Romanian wrestler. He competed in the men's freestyle 48 kg at the 1980 Summer Olympics.

References

1955 births
Living people
Romanian male sport wrestlers
Olympic wrestlers of Romania
Wrestlers at the 1980 Summer Olympics
People from Caraș-Severin County